The 2010–11 Ethiopian Premier League is the season of the Ethiopian Premier League since its establishment in 1944. A total of 16 teams are contesting the league, with Saint-George SA the defending champions for the third year in a row and for the twenty fourth time in total. The Ethiopian season began on 6 August 2010.

Clubs

 Adama City FC
 Awassa City FC
 Banks SC
 Defence
 Dedebit
 Dire Dawa City
 EEPCO
 Ethiopian Coffee
 Ethiopian Insurance
 Harrar Beer Bottling FC
 Meta Abo Brewery
 Metehara Sugar
 Muger Cement
 Saint-George SA
 Sebeta City
 Sidama Coffee
 Southern Police
 Trans Ethiopia

League table

External links
www.khanua.jimdo.com
www.ethiofootball.com
Ethiosports

Premier League
Premier League
Ethiopian Premier League
Ethiopian Premier League